Eimear Noone (born in Kilconnell, County Galway) is an Irish conductor and composer, best known for her award-winning work on video game music.  She has conducted the Philadelphia Orchestra, the Royal Philharmonic, Orchestre National de Bretagne, the Sydney Symphony, the Danish National Symphony Orchestra, and several other national orchestras.  Noone was the first woman to conduct at the Oscars on 9 February 2020, leading the orchestra in excerpts from the five nominated film scores. Noone was also the first woman to conduct at the National Concert Hall in Dublin, Ireland. A documentary about the life of Eimear Noone is currently in production by Krenshaw Films.

Early life 
Originally from Kilconnell, Noone is a graduate of Trinity College, Dublin who has taught conducting for UCLA Extension, Columbia College Chicago, the Society of Composers and Lyricists, and the LA Conducting Salon at the LA Ballet School. Noone co-founded the Dublin City Concert Orchestra and is co-creator of the Dublin International Game Music Festival.

Work 
Noone's composing and conducting work includes 26 film and video game titles, including notable Blizzard Entertainment titles Overwatch (2016), Hearthstone (2014), Diablo III (2012), Starcraft II: Wings of Liberty (2010), and World of Warcraft (2004) and its expansions., as well as The Legend of Zelda 25th Anniversary Special Orchestra CD included with The Legend of Zelda: Skyward Sword and the following Symphony of the Goddesses Tour. As a part of the 25th Anniversary celebration of the Legend of Zelda Series, Eímear Noone's conducting was filmed as the first three-dimensional footage of a symphony orchestra for the Nintendo 3DS. Noone has helped bring to life BASE Hologram's new show, The Maria Callas Hologram Tour. Featuring conducting by Eimear Noone and a hologram of the iconic soprano and live, synced, classical music to match the singers performance. 

In 2016 she worked with Tommy Tallarico, conducting the Video Games Live European Tour.

In 2019 she took over from Jessica Curry as the presenter of the Classic FM show High Score, which features orchestral arrangements of video games music. 

In 2020, she became the first female conductor to ever perform at the Academy Awards.

Awards and nominations 
Eímear Noone's score for "World of WarCraft: Warlords of Draenor" received the "Hollywood Music in Media Award" in 2014 for "Best Video Game Score", and was nominated for five "Annual game Music Awards 2014".

References

External links
 CONAN THE BARBARIAN - 2017 Concert (Live) - Eimear Noon
 Malach Angel Messenger, for World of Warcraft, Warlords of Draenor By Eimear Noone Featuring Malukah and a cast of thousands.
 "Skyrim" conducted by Eimear Noone, Monterrey, Mexico, 5 April 2014
 Eimear Noone Conducts the Danish National Symphony - "Gaming in Symphony."

Year of birth missing (living people)
Living people
Video game composers
Women conductors (music)
Irish radio presenters
Irish women radio presenters
Irish conductors (music)
Alumni of Trinity College Dublin
21st-century conductors (music)
21st-century Irish women musicians
21st-century Irish musicians
People from County Galway
University of California, Los Angeles faculty
Columbia College Chicago faculty